Lazare Octave Georges Victor Gallian (21 July 1855, Toulon – 10 January 1918, Paris) was a French painter, known for portraits an landscapes.

Biography 
He was born to an industrialist who originally came from Vaucluse. Raised in an affluent environment, he initially showed great talent for playing the violin and piano, but eventually chose to pursue a career in art. In 1873, aged only eighteen, he became an associate in a workshop in Toulon, operated by Frédéric Montenard and Gustave Garaud.

To improve his skills, he attended at the École des Beaux-Arts in Paris, then enrolled at the Académie Julian, where he studied with Jules Lefebvre, Gustave Boulanger and .After graduating, he established his studio on the Rue du Faubourg Saint-Honoré, focusing primarily on female portraits. He maintained ties to his hometown, however, as a member of the "Atelier des Beaux-Arts de Toulon". 

Between 1878 and 1905, he was a regular exhibitor at the Salon. In 1884, he was given honorable mention for a painting of buoys in Toulon harbor. His wife, Honorine Lambert, appeared as a model in many of his paintings.

They were destroyed during a bombardment in World War II.

Both of his sons were taken prisoner in World War I and placed in remote camps. This put a strain on his already fragile health and resulted in his death.

His works may be seen at the Musée d'Angoulême, Musée de la Castre, Musée d'art de Toulon and the Musée de la Marine.

References

Further reading 
 Jean-Roger Soubiran, André Alauzen, André Bourde, Marie-Claude Homet, Marie-Christine Gloton, Pierre Lesage et al., La peinture en Provence dans les collections du musée de Toulon du XVIIe au début du XXe siècle,  Musée de Toulon, 1985 
 Jean-Roger Soubiran, Denise Jasmin, Jean-Jacques Gloton, Jacques Foucart, Jean-Claude Lesage et al, Le musée a cent ans, Musée de Toulon, 1989

External links 

1855 births
1918 deaths
19th-century French painters
French portrait painters
French landscape painters
Académie Julian
École des Beaux-Arts
Artists from Toulon
20th-century French painters